Kotlevo is a rural locality in Zakharkovsky Selsoviet Rural Settlement, Konyshyovsky District, Kursk Oblast, Russia. Population:

Geography 
The village is located on the Kotlevka River (a tributary of the Vablya in the basin of the Seym), 67 km from the Russia–Ukraine border, 57 km north-west of Kursk, 7.5 km north-east of the district center – the urban-type settlement Konyshyovka, 8 km from the selsoviet center – Zakharkovo.

 Climate
Kotlevo has a warm-summer humid continental climate (Dfb in the Köppen climate classification).

Transport 
Kotlevo is located 62 km from the federal route  Ukraine Highway, 37 km from the route  Crimea Highway, 39.5 km from the route  (Trosna – M3 highway), 23 km from the road of regional importance  (Fatezh – Dmitriyev), 4.5 km from the road  (Konyshyovka – Zhigayevo – 38K-038), on the road of intermunicipal significance  (38K-005 – Maloye Gorodkovo – Bolshoye Gorodkovo), 5.5 km from the nearest railway halt 552 km (railway line Navlya – Lgov-Kiyevsky).

The rural locality is situated 63 km from Kursk Vostochny Airport, 159 km from Belgorod International Airport and 264 km from Voronezh Peter the Great Airport.

References

Notes

Sources

Rural localities in Konyshyovsky District